Natalie Thoumas (born 30 April 1962 at Agen) is a former French middle-distance runner, who specialized in the 800 metres. In 1983, she won the gold medal at the Mediterranean Games, at Casablanca in Morocco.

She won nine national titles in the 800 m: six outdoors at the French Athletics Championships in 1981, 1982, 1983, 1985, 1986 and 1989, and three at the French Indoor Athletics Championships in 1984, 1988 and 1991.

Her personal best at 800 m, established in 1987, is 1:59.83.

Prize list
 French Athletics Championships
800 m: 1981,  1982,  1983, 1985, 1986, 1989
 French Indoor Athletics Championships:  
800 m: 1984, 1988, 1991

Personal bests

References

 Docathlé2003, Fédération française d'athlétisme, 2003, p. 433

External links

1962 births
Living people
Sportspeople from Agen
French female middle-distance runners
Mediterranean Games gold medalists for France
Mediterranean Games medalists in athletics
Athletes (track and field) at the 1983 Mediterranean Games
20th-century French women